Scipio Carocci or Scipio Carocius (1649–1702) was a Roman Catholic prelate who served as Bishop of Acerno (1696–1702).

Biography
Scipio Carocci was born in Gaete on 22 April 1649. On 17 December 1696, he was appointed during the papacy of Pope Innocent XII as Bishop of Acerno. On 21 December 1696, he was consecrated bishop by Sebastiano Antonio Tanara, Cardinal-Priest of Santi Quattro Coronati, with Prospero Bottini, Titular Archbishop of Myra, and Giorgio Spínola, Bishop of Albenga, serving as co-consecrators. He served as Bishop of Acerno until his death in June 1702.

References

External links and additional sources
 (for Chronology of Bishops) 
 (for Chronology of Bishops) 

17th-century Italian Roman Catholic bishops
18th-century Italian Roman Catholic bishops
Bishops appointed by Pope Innocent XII
1649 births
1702 deaths